Liu Chengming may refer to:
 Liu Chengming (athlete)
 Liu Chengming (diver)